Jayasimha may refer to:

People
 Jayasimha (Vatapi Chalukya dynasty), reigned in early 6th century
 Jayasimha I (Eastern Chalukya dynasty), reigned c. 641–673
 Jayasimha II (Eastern Chalukya dynasty), reigned 706–718 in the Eastern Chalukyas
 Jayasimha II (Western Chalukya dynasty) (1015–1042), reigned 1015–1043
 Jayasimha I (Paramara dynasty), reigned c. 1055–1070
 Jayasimha II (Paramara dynasty), reigned c. 1255–1274; alias Jayavarman II
 Jayasimha Siddharaja (Chaulukya dynasty), reigned c. 1092–1142
 Jayasimha (Kalachuri dynasty), reigned c. 1163-1188
 Jayasimha (Chudasama dynasty), early ruler
 Jayasimha I (Chudasama dynasty), reigned 1351-1378
 Jayasimha II (Chudasama dynasty), reigned 1415-1430

Other
 Jayasimha (1955 film), an Indian Telugu film
 Jayasimha (1987 film), an Indian Kannada film

See also 
 Jai Simha, a 2018 Telugu action drama film,
 Jai Singh (disambiguation), another transliteration of the name
 Jaya (disambiguation)